Sudhir Kumar Chaudhary (born 1982 in Muzaffarpur, Bihar), also called Sudhir Kumar Gautam, is an Indian teacher who is fan of the Indian cricket team and Sachin Tendulkar. He is widely recognised for attending every home match the Indian team has played since 2007. For some overseas tours, he collects funds from the public. He is usually seen in stadium with his body painted in the national colours of India, waving the national flag in the live telecast of the matches.

Personal life
Sudhir Choudhary was born in a very poor 
family in a semi-rural place of Muzaffarpur, Bihar. He became obsessed with Indian cricket and a fan of Sachin Tendulkar at the age of 6. He left his studies at the age of 14 when he was in his secondary school. He is unemployed, having previously worked for a milk company and trained as a teacher. He postponed his marriage so that he could watch all the matches played by the Indian cricket team, and wants to follow the team all over the world, wherever it plays. This style of living followed by Sudhir Kumar has made his parents unhappy, and he once threatened self-immolation if he was not assured of watching all cricket matches played by the Indian cricket team. He declared that his life is dedicated to watching Indian cricket matches and he lives his life on public support.

Sudhir Kumar is one of three principal roles of a documentary film Beyond All Boundaries which tells the stories of three different personalities of Indian cricket and he is shown as a super fan of the sport. Made by film maker Sushrut Jain, the film shows details about the personal life of Sudhir Kumar.

Cricket fan

Since 2003, Sudhir Chaudhary's passion has been to watch cricket matches played by India and to support the team. By April 2010, he had attended approximately 150 matches, often traveling by bicycle to reach the venue of match. He sometimes pedals his cycle to cricket playing venues, as he did to Bangladesh to witness a cricket match in 2007  and to Lahore, Pakistan in 2006. To save money, he sometimes braves ticketless travel in trains to reach venues. When attending cricket matches, he paints his body with the tri- colour, the colours of India flag, and he usually paints the name of Tendulkar on his chest. He carries a conch with him and blows the conch to announce the arrival of the Indian cricket team. Sudhir Chaudhary paints his body on the previous day of a match and skips sleep that night to preserve the paint on his body. He cycled for 21 days from Muzaffarpur, Bihar to Mumbai to watch Sachin play for India against Australia on 28 October 2003 and this was the first tri-series match where he started supporting India by waving Indian tri-colour.

2011 ICC Cricket World Cup 
During the World Cup, Sudhir sported a kooky crown - a replica World Cup trophy. Sudhir's crowning moment came on 2 April 2011, the day India defeated Sri Lanka in the final at Wankhede Stadium, Mumbai, to become the world champions. Sachin Tendulkar himself signaled Sudhir who was sitting among the cheering Indian fans, to come to the Indian dressing room and join the team's celebrations. Tendulkar asked Zaheer Khan to bring the World Cup over. Tendulkar shook hands with Sudhir Kumar, hugged him and finally let him lift the cup from Zaheer’s hands. Tendulkar allowed Sudhir to hold the World Cup along with him and Sudhir celebrated the occasion by posing for photographs.  Sudhir chanted ’India’ as he lifted the ICC Cricket World Cup 2011 trophy.

Apology by the police
In March 2010, a Senior Police officer intercepted and thrashed Sudhir Kumar in Kanpur, when he tried to shake hands with Sachin Tendulkar during a practice session. Later, after Tendulkar's intervention and request he was let off, and the police officer tendered an apology to Sudhir Kumar, repenting the event. Sudhir Kumar stopped the practice of scaling fences to reach the team to celebrate a win, only after Tendulkar advised against such practice. After this incident, the BCCI has sponsored Sudhir Kumar for every match.

Attack by Bangladesh Cricket fans 
In 2015, during India - Bangladesh series in Mirpur, he was attacked and harassed by Bangladesh fans booing against India, when he was trying to leave the stadium. He feared for his life but was eventually rescued by Bangladesh Police.

See also 
 Cricket in India

References

Cricket supporters
1983 births
Living people
People from Bihar
People from Muzaffarpur district